Kampong Tumasek is an area in Bandar Seri Begawan, the capital of Brunei, as well as a village within Mukim Kianggeh in Brunei-Muara District. The population was 673 in 2016. It has the postcode BA2112.

References 

Neighbourhoods in Bandar Seri Begawan
Villages in Brunei-Muara District